is a member of the Japanese House of Councillors and member of the Japanese Communist Party. She was a former nurse. She has previously served on the Kyoto Prefectural Assembly, to which she was elected in 1994, and on the Kyoto City Assembly, to which she served five terms, starting with her election to the assembly in 1995. Kurabayashi was elected to her position in the National Diet in 2013.

Kurabayashi is opposed to the pension reform bill that was enacted in 2016, saying that the reduced pension benefits would weight heavily on the Japanese public. She is also opposed to allowing non-Japanese trainees to work in the Japanese nursing industry, saying that the plan would not permanently address the chronic labour shortage in Japan's nursing industry.

References

1960 births
Living people
Japanese communists
Japanese Communist Party politicians
Members of the Kyoto Prefectural Assembly